Frank Airey (born 1887) was a footballer who played in The Football League for Gainsborough Trinity. He also played for Trinity Institute.

References

English footballers
Gainsborough Trinity F.C. players
English Football League players
1887 births
Year of death missing
Association football goalkeepers